Shiloh Road station is a future station located in Plano, Texas on the under-construction Dallas Area Rapid Transit Silver Line. It is located near the Southwest corner of 14th Street and Shiloh Road. The City of Plano bought land for the future station in 2012 in anticipation of establishing rail service. The line is under construction and is scheduled to open in late 2025 to mid-2026. It will be the eastern terminal for the commuter line, until the towns of Murphy, Texas and Wylie, Texas become member cities and allow for expansion.

References

Dallas Area Rapid Transit commuter rail stations
Railway stations scheduled to open in 2025
Railway stations scheduled to open in 2026
Proposed public transportation in Texas
Proposed railway stations in the United States